Christina Dieckmann Jiménez (born April 22, 1977) is a Venezuelan model, actress, who participated in Miss Venezuela 1997 where she won a chance to go to Miss World. She then became a model and has worked for numerous advertising campaigns in Venezuela, U.S. and Brazil including Diet Pepsi. She has also appeared in a variety of soap operas including as Cibele in Seus Olhos in Brazil and Dama y Obrero (2013 telenovela) in United States and in many other soap operas.

Filmography
 Amantes de Luna Llena (2000) as Bárbara
 Gata Salvaje (2002) as Estrella Marina Gutiérrez
 ¡Qué buena se puso Lola! (2004) as She Herself
 Seus Olhos (2004) as Cibele
 Se solicita príncipe azul (2005) as Victoria 
 Y los declaro marido y mujer (2006) as Eloína Diaz
 Toda una dama (2007) as Valeria Aguirre
 Un esposo para Estela (2009) as Jennifer Noriega Roldán de Alberti
 Dama y obrero (American telenovela) (2013) as Karina Cuervo

References

Living people
1977 births
People from Caracas
Venezuelan people of German descent
Venezuelan female models
Venezuelan telenovela actresses
Miss Venezuela World winners
Miss World 1997 delegates
Actresses from Caracas